Ancylosis plumbatella is a species of snout moth in the genus Ancylosis. It was described by Ragonot, in 1888. It is found in the Achal Tekke region in central Asia.

References

Moths described in 1888
plumbatella
Moths of Asia